Peziza moseri is a species of cup fungus belonging to the family Pezizaceae. It was officially described as new to science in 1974 from collections made in Israel. It fruits singly or in groups on burnt ground in coniferous forests.

References

External links

Pezizaceae
Fungi described in 1974
Fungi of Europe
Fungi of Western Asia